Palmers Shipbuilding and Iron Company Limited, often referred to simply as "Palmers", was a British shipbuilding company. The Company was based in Jarrow, County Durham, in north-eastern England, and also had operations in Hebburn and Willington Quay on the River Tyne.

History

Early history and growth

The company was established in 1852 by Charles Mark Palmer as Palmer Brothers & Co. in Jarrow. Later that year it launched the John Bowes, the first iron screw collier. By 1900 the business was known as Palmers Shipbuilding and Iron Company. At that time, besides building ships, it manufactured and processed its own steel and other metals, and its products included Reed water tube boilers and marine steam engines. By 1902 Palmers' base at Jarrow occupied about 100 acres (41 hectares) and included 0.75 miles (1.2 kilometres) of the southern bank of the River Tyne, and employed about 10,000 men and boys. In 1910 Sir Charles Palmer's interest in the business was acquired by Lord Furness who, as Chairman, expanded the business by acquiring a lease over a new graving dock at Hebburn from Robert Stephenson and Company.

Depression and collapse
The Great Depression, which began in 1929, all but destroyed the shipbuilding industry, which would not rebound until the Second World War. In 1931, Palmers posted a loss of £88,867. The company received a  moratorium from its creditors in order to extend repayment. In January 1933, the majority of the company's unsecured creditors met in London and agreed to extend  the moratorium a further six months.

However, Palmers' was unable to survive and collapsed by the end of the year. The company's blast furnaces and steel works—which covered 37 acres—were put up for auction. The Jarrow yard was sold to National Shipbuilders Securities, which closed it down in order to sell it, causing much unemployment and leading to the Jarrow March. After the shipyard closed, following support from the industrialist, Sir John Jarvis, the site was used the engine shop as a steel foundry for another 18 months.

The company retained the yard at Hebburn and was subsequently acquired by Armstrong Whitworth, becoming Palmers Hebburn Company. In 1973, Vickers-Armstrongs, successor to Armstrong Whitworth, sold the Palmers Dock at Hebburn to Swan Hunter and developed it as the Hebburn Shipbuilding Dock. This facility was acquired in turn from the receivers of Swan Hunter by Tyne Tees Dockyard in 1994, which sold it to Cammell Laird in 1995. When the latter entered receivership in 2001, the dock was acquired by A&P Group. The yard remains in use as a ship repair and refurbishment facility.

Ships built by Palmers Shipbuilding and Iron Company

Ships built by Palmers included:

Naval

Battlecruisers
  Royal Navy (1912)

Battleships

  Royal Navy (1861)
  Royal Navy (1910)
  Royal Navy (1906)
  Royal Navy (1892)
  Royal Navy (1915)
  Royal Navy (1892)
  Royal Navy (1901)
  Royal Navy (1870)
  Royal Navy (1856)
  Royal Navy (1870)

Cruisers

  Royal Navy (1885)
  Royal Navy (1918)
  Royal Navy (1886)
  Royal Navy (1897)
  Royal Navy (1890)
  Royal Navy (1897)
  Royal Canadian Navy (1891)
  Royal Navy (1891)
  Royal Navy (1885)
  Royal Navy (1886)
  Royal Navy (1928)

Destroyers

  Royal Navy (1896)
  Royal Navy (1896)
  Royal Navy (1903)
  Royal Navy (1896)
  Royal Navy (1903)
  Royal Navy (1932)
  Royal Navy (1932)
  Royal Navy (1903)
  Royal Navy (1903)
  Royal Navy (1903)
  Royal Navy (1897)
  Royal Navy (1897)
  Royal Navy (1897)
  Royal Navy (1895)
  Royal Navy (1900)
  Royal Navy (1895)
  Royal Canadian Navy (1932)
  Royal Navy (1900)
  Royal Navy (1899)
  Royal Navy (1895)
  Royal Navy (1904)
  Royal Navy (1899)
  Royal Navy (1896)
  Royal Navy (1905)
  Royal Navy (1900)
  Royal Navy (1904)
  Royal Navy (1905)
  Royal Navy (1896)
  Royal Navy (1918)

Monitors

  Victorian Navy (1868)
  Royal Navy (1915)
  Royal Navy (1871)
  Royal Navy (1915)
  Royal Navy (1915)

River gunboats

  Royal Navy (1877)
  Royal Navy (1877)
  Royal Navy (1877)
  Royal Navy (1876)
  Royal Navy (1876)
  Austro-Hungarian Navy (1889)
  Royal Navy (1876)
  Royal Navy (1877)
  Royal Navy (1876)
  Royal Navy (1876)
  Royal Navy (1876)
  Royal Navy (1877)
  Royal Navy (1877)

Merchant and leisure

Cable ships
  Atlantic Telegraph Company (1923)

Cargo ships
Anne Thomas  Evan Thomas Radcliffe (1882)
Anthony Radcliffe  Evan Thomas Radcliffe (1893)
  Alfred Holt and Company (1922)
Clarrisa Radcliffe  Evan Thomas Radcliffe (1889)
Douglas Hill  Evan Thomas Radcliffe (1890)
  British-India Steam Navigation Company (1919)
Gwenllian Thomas  Evan Thomas Radcliffe (1882)
Iolo Morganwg  Evan Thomas Radcliffe (1882)
John Bowes  Charles Palmer (1852)
Kate Thomas  Evan Thomas Radcliffe (1884)
Lady Palmer  Evan Thomas Radcliffe (1889)
Mary Thomas  Evan Thomas Radcliffe (1889)
  China Mutual Steam Navigation Company (1922)
Slavic Prince (Prince Line Ltd, Newcastle) (1918)

Oil tankers
British Ardour  British Tanker Company (1928)
British Aviator  British Tanker Company (1924)
British Captain  British Tanker Company (1923)
British Chemist  British Tanker Company (1925)
  British Tanker Company (1929)
  British Tanker Company (1922)
British Freedom  British Tanker Company (1928)
British General  British Tanker Company (1922)
British Honour  British Tanker Company (1928)
British Industry  British Tanker Company (1927)
British Inventor  British Tanker Company (1926)
British Justice  British Tanker Company (1928)
British Light  British Tanker Company (1917)
British Loyalty  British Tanker Company (1928)
British Mariner  British Tanker Company (1922)
British Officer  British Tanker Company (1922)
  British Tanker Company (1922)
British Science  British Tanker Company (1931)
  British Tanker Company (1922)
British Splendour  British Tanker Company (1931)
British Strength  British Tanker Company (1931)
British Yeoman  British Tanker Company (1923)

Passenger ships
 (1860)
 (1896)
*

Steam yachts
Xantha  Henry Paget, 2nd Marquess of Anglesey (1867)

Tugs
PT Northumberland  G. Wascoe, Shields, 1852 Yard number 1

Cargo vessels
 S.S. Socotra, 1897

See also
 List of shipbuilders and shipyards

References

Footnotes

Notes

Bibliography

External links

Defunct shipbuilding companies of England
Marine engine manufacturers
Jarrow
Engine manufacturers of the United Kingdom